The 2010 Pan American Trampoline and Tumbling Championships were held in Daytona Beach, United States, March 25–27, 2010.

Medalists

Pan American Cup 

Unrelated to the 2010 Pan American Trampoline Championships, an event known as the Pan American Cup was organized in Guadalajara, Mexico, on December 4, 2010, as a qualifying event for the individual trampoline competition at the 2011 Pan American Games. The results of the 2010 Pan American Cup are as follows.

References 

2010 in gymnastics
Pan American Gymnastics Championships
International gymnastics competitions hosted by the United States
2010 in American sports